The molecular formula C10H14N5O7P (molar mass: 347.22 g/mol) may refer to:

 Adenosine monophosphate (AMP)
 Deoxyguanosine monophosphate (dGMP)
 Vidarabine phosphate